The Kansas Phoenix, formerly called the Missouri Phoenix, is a professional women's American football team based in Kansas City, Kansas. They play in the Women's Spring Football League. The Phoenix played in the Women's Football Alliance.  Home games are played on the campus of Piper High School.

The Phoenix was originally part of the National Women's Football Association before moving to the Women's Football Alliance and then the team changed their name.

Season-By-Season

|-
|2009 || 0 || 8 || 0 || 5th American Midwest || --

2009 Season Schedule

** = Game cancelled due to weather, St. Louis won by forfeit

External links
 KANSAS PHOENIX

Sports in the Kansas City metropolitan area
Women's Football Alliance teams
American football teams in Kansas
American football teams in Missouri
American football teams established in 2009
2009 establishments in Kansas
Women's sports in Missouri
Women's sports in Kansas